The myna (also spelled mynah) is a bird of the starling family (Sturnidae). This is a group of passerine birds which are native to southern Asia, especially India, Pakistan and Bangladesh. Several species have been introduced to areas like North America, Australia, South Africa, Fiji and New Zealand, especially the common myna, which is often regarded as an invasive species. It is often known as "Selarang" and "Teck Meng" in Malay and Chinese respectively in Singapore, having a high population there.

Mynas are not a natural group; instead, the term myna is used for any starling in the Indian subcontinent, regardless of their relationships. This range was colonized twice during the evolution of starlings, first by rather ancestral starlings related to the coleto and Aplonis lineages, and millions of years later by birds related to the common starling and wattled starling's ancestors. These two groups of mynas can be distinguished in the more terrestrial adaptions of the latter, which usually also have less glossy plumage, except on the heads, and longer tails. The Bali myna, which is critically endangered and nearly extinct in the wild, is highly distinctive.

Some mynas are considered talking birds, for their ability to reproduce sounds, including human speech, when in captivity.

Myna is derived from the Hindi language mainā which itself is derived from Sanskrit madanā.

Characteristics

Mynas are medium-sized passerines with strong feet. Their flight is strong and direct, and they are gregarious. Their preferred habitat is fairly open country, and they eat insects and fruit.

Plumage is typically dark, often brown, although some species have yellow head ornaments. Most species nest in holes.

Some species have become well known for their imitative skills; the common hill myna is one of these.

Species

The following are species of mynas. The coleto and the two Saroglossa starlings are included because of their position in the taxonomic list.

Jungle and hill mynas

 Yellow-faced myna, Mino dumontii
 Golden myna, Mino anais
 Long-tailed myna, Mino kreffti
 Sulawesi myna, Basilornis celebensis
 Helmeted myna, Basilornis galeatus
 Long-crested myna, Basilornis corythaix
 Apo myna, Basilornis miranda
 White-necked myna, Streptocitta albicollis
 Bare-eyed myna, Streptocitta albertinae
 Fiery-browed myna, Enodes erythrophris
 Finch-billed myna, Scissirostrum dubium
 Golden-crested myna, Ampeliceps coronatus
 Common hill myna, Gracula religiosa
 Southern hill myna, Gracula indica
 Enggano hill myna, Gracula enganensis
 Nias hill myna, Gracula robusta
 Sri Lanka hill myna, Gracula ptilogenys

"True" mynas

 Great myna, Acridotheres grandis
 Crested myna, Acridotheres cristatellus
 Javan myna, Acridotheres javanicus
 Pale-bellied myna, Acridotheres cinereus
 Jungle myna, Acridotheres fuscus
 Collared myna, Acridotheres albocinctus
 Bank myna, Acridotheres ginginianus
 Common myna, Acridotheres tristis
 Bali myna, Leucopsar rothschildi

"Gracupica" mynas

 Indian pied myna, Gracupica contra
 Siamese pied myna, Gracupica floweri
 Javan pied myna, Gracupica jalla

The following species are often included in the Acridotheres mynas:

 Vinous-breasted starling, Acridotheres burmannicus
 Black-winged starling, Sturnus melanopterus
 Red-billed starling, Sturnus sericeus
 White-cheeked starling, Sturnus cineraceus

References

Sources

External links

 Myna videos on the Internet Bird Collection
 Recording of a Myna bird in Yogyakarta, Indonesia

Sturnidae
Bird common names